A League of Their Own is a British sports-based comedy panel game that was first broadcast on Sky One (now Sky Max) on 11 March 2010. The show is currently hosted by Romesh Ranganathan and features Jamie Redknapp as a team captain and Micah Richards as a regular panellist.

Format
The show is a standard panel quiz show where two teams of three, the Red and Blue teams compete for points awarded in three rounds, to find the overall winning team by points total.

Round 1 involves both teams having to rank three different sportspersons according to a specific criterion.
Round 2, Guest List, involves both teams having to guess the answers given by a sportsperson about his or her sport.
Round 3, The Final Challenge, formerly known as the Right Guard Challenge, sees two members of each team have to answer questions for as long as the third team member can sustain a physical challenge in the studio.

Participants
The show was hosted for the first 13 series by James Corden. The Red Team is captained by former Liverpool and England footballer Jamie Redknapp, who was formerly joined by once regular panellist and stand-up comedian John Bishop. In series 5, Bishop was absent for several episodes due to his Sport Relief challenge, eventually leaving the show as a regular. Redknapp was joined on the red team by comedian Romesh Ranganathan for series 13 and 14. The Blue Team was captained by retired Lancashire and England cricketer Freddie Flintoff for the first 16 series. Flintoff was replaced by a series of guest captains starting from series 17. For the first four series Flintoff was joined by then Sky Sports F1 presenter Georgie Thompson. From series 5, comedian Jack Whitehall replaced Thompson as regular panellist on the blue team due to her F1 commitments. Whitehall himself left the show after series 12. Micah Richards became the blue team's regular panellist from series 17. Each episode the teams are supplemented by special guests.

Neither Corden, Redknapp nor Thompson had been regular features on a television panel show before. Corden was non-committal about whether the show marked a new direction for him as a television host, stating "I spend most of my time sitting in a room with my mates talking about sport anyway. To get paid to do such a thing will be great. I hope it will be a fun show and people will enjoy watching it." Redknapp said "I'm loving it, but it is nerve-wracking" and "the key is to try to have a bit of fun, but to remember that we're not comedians and can't compete with the professionals" referring to Bishop and Corden. Thompson said of the show that it was "the fun factor that I've been looking for" and represented an "exciting opportunity" in her career.

Due to Corden's commitments to his U.S. talk show The Late Late Show, the 14th series was presented, in part, by guest hosts. Corden's absence was extended into the 15th series due to the COVID-19 pandemic. This series was hosted mainly by Ranganathan with Flintoff and Redknapp hosting one episode apiece. Ranganathan was confirmed as the show's new permanent host starting from series 16.

Production
The show was created by Paul Brassey, a development producer at CPL Productions. The show was recorded in Pinewood Studios (BBC Elstree Centre from series 3, and Elstree Film Studios from series 12), being filmed on Mondays and Tuesdays in front of a live studio audience. The show was commissioned by Duncan Gray, with Gray, Danielle Lux and Murray Boland acting as Executive Producers. It was announced on 20 October 2009 that the pilot for the show would be hosted by Corden alongside team captains Redknapp and England cricketer Stuart Broad, although Broad was replaced in the line up by Flintoff by the time of the series 1 start. Executive producer Danielle Lux said it would be "an Olympic standard comedy show for anyone who loves their sport and a fun-filled half-hour for those who don't." The pilot was recorded on 24 October, and was due to be aired later in 2009. Sky One's promotion for the show included a TV advert featuring Corden mis-kicking a football, spoofing contemporary serious sportswear advertising campaigns, accompanied by the tagline "the new panel show that doesn't take sport too seriously".

Reception
Keith Watson of the Metro welcomed the show as a challenger to "Britain's No.1 TV sports spot-the-scripted-bits banter show", referring to the BBC's show A Question of Sport, hosted by Sue Barker. Watson, writing after the first episode, said "Team skippers Freddie Flintoff and Jamie Redknapp are just there as window-dressing/butts of jokes, for this is Corden's show and he takes to it like a puck to the ice rink. [Sue] Barker beware." Sharon Lougher and Larushka Ivan-Zadeh also of the Metro went further, announcing the show as "basically, A Question of Sport for idiots ... the televisual equivalent of Nuts magazine".

Writing after the first episode, Harry Venning of The Stage panned the show, summarising it as "Imagine A Question of Sport without the sports questions, combined with They Think It's All Over without the comedy". Criticising the length of the opening hour-long special, Venning said it contained some fine gags but not enough of them, and the format was "dull, unimaginative and painfully protracted", albeit praising Flintoff for being "surprisingly witty and charming".

The British Comedy Guide said of the first episode that "the sportsman-dominated panel showed: very few laughs, and little charm" and were not convinced of the format, although conceding that not being sports fans they might not be the target audience.

Guest appearances

The following have made more than one appearance on the show as a guest (up to and including series 17, episode 8):

23 appearances
Jimmy Carr

12 appearances
Rob Beckett
David Walliams

8 appearances
Gabby Logan

7 appearances
John Bishop
Josh Widdicombe

6 appearances
Tom Davis

5 appearances
Kevin Bridges
Joel Dommett
Micky Flanagan
Romesh Ranganathan
Jack Whitehall

4 appearances

Maisie Adam
Clare Balding
Tony Bellew
Alex Brooker
Alan Carr
Roisin Conaty
Jessica Ennis-Hill
Mo Farah
Anthony Joshua
Lee Mack
Dara Ó Briain
Jonathan Ross
Helen Skelton
Claudia Winkleman

3 appearances

Tom Allen
Dina Asher-Smith
Richard Ayoade
Aisling Bea
Ashley Cole
Kerry Godliman
Amanda Holden
Jenny Jones
Frank Lampard
Jason Manford
Judy Murray
Sam Quek
Harry Redknapp
Micah Richards
Katherine Ryan
Laura Woods

2 appearances

Nicola Adams
James Anderson
Christine Bleakley
Jo Brand
Peter Crouch
Sara Cox
Tom Daley
Patrice Evra
Noel Fielding
Robbie Fowler
Joe Hart
Niall Horan
Russell Howard
Chris Hoy
Katarina Johnson-Thompson
Jade Jones
Ruth Jones
Laura Kenny
Guz Khan
Nish Kumar
Denise Lewis
Stephen Mangan
Neil Morrissey
Andy Murray
Gary Neville
Dermot O'Leary
Adam Peaty
Kevin Pietersen
Jon Richardson
Alex Scott
Johnny Vegas
Heather Watson
Amy Williams

a.  One of their appearances was as a guest team captain.
b.  Appearances made after series 5, when Bishop was no longer a regular panellist.
c.  Appearances made before Whitehall became a regular panellist.
d.  Appearances made before Ranganathan became a regular panellist or permanent host.
e.  Includes one appearance as host
f.  Two of their appearances were as a guest team captain.
g.  Appearances made before Richards became a regular panellist.

Transmissions

Original

Series

Specials

Road Trip

Series

g.  Series titled Loch Ness to London.
h.  Series titled Dingle to Dover.

Specials

International versions

Australian version
An Australian version of A League of Their Own aired on Network Ten on 16 September 2013. It was presented by comedian Tommy Little and the captains were tennis star Pat Cash and swimmer Eamon Sullivan. The series had ten episodes. Nine episodes were broadcast with the tenth episode being viewed online after it was cancelled to immediate effect after posting a disappointing rating in the show's ninth week.

Danish version
A Danish version of A League of Their Own aired on Kanal 5 on 7 September 2015. The Danish title  is "5. Halvleg", in English: "5th half". The show is presented by comedian Carsten Bang and the captains are former professional cyclist Jesper Skibby and comedian Jesper Juhl. In the first series, there was 10 episodes, and the last aired on 5 November 2015.

The first series was very successful, with good ratings, and Kanal 5 decided to renew the show for a second series, with the premiere on 18 February 2016. The series contained 8 episodes, with the same host and captains as in series 1. The last episode of series 2 aired on 14 April 2016.

Series 2 was another successful series for Kanal 5, and they decided to renew the show for a third series, with the same host and captains as in the first two series. The first episode of series 3 aired on 4 September 2016.

Series 4 on 5 went on with the same host and captains. The first episode of series 4 aired on 12 February 2017 and the last episode aired on 22 June 2017. The first episode of series 5 aired on 2 November 2017.

Awards

Host Carsten Bang was nominated for Best Host at Zulu Awards 2016.

German version
A German version of A League of Their Own called Eine Liga für sich - Buschis Sechserkette, in English: A League of its Own - Buschi's Chain of Six aired on German TV channel Sky 1 on 13 March 2017. It is presented by sports commentator and former basketball player Frank Buschmann. Comedian Matze Knop and television host and former professional handball player Panagiota Petridou serve as captains.

American version
An American version of A League of Their Own called Game On! aired on CBS on 27 May 2020 until 22 July 2020. The show was hosted by Keegan-Michael Key with tennis champion Venus Williams and three-time Super Bowl champion Rob Gronkowski as team captains. James Corden (who hosts The Late Late Show for the network and was the presenter of the original British version) served as executive producer of the show. At the time, this version was going to be aired on 20 May before the change to 27 May.

References

External links

A League of Their Own Online Game

2010 British television series debuts
2010s British sports television series
2010s British game shows
2020s British sports television series
2020s British game shows
British panel games
Sky UK original programming
Television series by Sony Pictures Television
English-language television shows
Television shows set in England
Television shows shot at BBC Elstree Centre
Television shows shot at Elstree Film Studios